The Florence Fire/EMS Department provides fire protection and emergency medical services to the citizens of Florence, Kentucky as well as the surrounding Florence Fire Protection District.

History
The Florence Fire Department was founded in 1936 as an all volunteer fire department, organized by the citizenry of Florence with no city affiliation. The first paid fire chief was hired in 1970, and six career firefighters were added in 1979 to supplement the volunteers.

In 1972, Florence Rescue, founded by Philip Black, which was later renamed Florence Emergency Medical Services, was organized. Just like the fire department, this organization was staffed by volunteers. In 1994 these two organizations were merged into a single department under the City of Florence and became known as the Florence Fire/EMS Department.

, Florence Fire/EMS employs 72 paid staff members including fire suppression personnel and 6 administrative personnel.

Stations and apparatus
, Florence Fire/EMS responds from the following Firehouses with the following Companies

References

Florence, Kentucky
Fire departments in Kentucky